The Ajvide Settlement is located in Ajvide, Eksta, on the western coast of Gotland, Sweden. The majority of the activity on the site took place during the Middle Neolithic period (3100 – 2700 BC). This phase of activity belongs to the Pitted Ware culture. Around 2900 BC, the site suffered from a marine transgression.

Archaeological excavations 
Since 1983, Stockholm University and later the Gotland University, have conducted archaeological investigations at the property. Inger Österholm together with Göran Burenhult, both professors of archeology at Gotland University, conducted much of the recent research on Neolithic Gotland, including the Ajvide Settlement.

The principal feature of the site is a burial ground containing some 80 graves. In some cases the graves are occupied by more than one individual, whilst others may be cenotaphs. Most of these graves date to later than the main phase of Pitted Ware activity. Adjacent to the cemetery, to the east, is an area of very dark soil that contains a mixture of artifacts, pottery and bone fragments. In some texts on this site, this area is referred to as the black area, and is believed to have a possible ceremonial function. However, Österholm has suggested that it may in fact represent the processing of seal train oil.

Find 
A significant faunal assemblage has been recovered from the site. This suggests that in the late Mesolithic, economy was based upon hunting of grey, ringed and harp seals, porpoise and fishing. Cattle, sheep, and pigs were introduced at the start of the Neolithic. However, there was a resurgence in seal hunting and fishing by the Middle Neolithic. Cattle and sheep returned during the late Neolithic and Bronze Age. It has been argued that the pigs which remain on Gotland during the Pitted Ware phase are in fact wild or feral animals, implying a general return to hunting and gathering during this period and not just a reversion to marine resources. Examination of the helical fracture pattern and dynamic impact scars of the bones from the Ajvide Settlement suggests that bone marrow extraction took place at this site.

References

Other sources 
Pots, Pits, and People. Hunter-Gatherer Pottery Traditions in Neolithic Sweden (Gheorghiu, Dragos. Cambridge: Cambridge Scholars Publishing. 2009)

Stone Age Europe
Nordic Bronze Age
Archaeological sites in Sweden
Gotland
Former populated places in Sweden
Geography of Gotland County